Wakefield is an unincorporated community in southwestern Scioto Township, Pike County, Ohio, United States.  it historically had a post office, with the ZIP code 45687.  Although the post office was closed on September 2, 2005, the community retains its ZIP code.  It lies along Wakefield Mound Road.

Gallery

References

External links
Community profile

Unincorporated communities in Ohio
Unincorporated communities in Pike County, Ohio